Mechem is a surname. Notable people with the surname include:

Edwin L. Mechem (1912–2002), Governor of New Mexico and US Senator
Kirke Mechem (born 1925), American composer
Merritt C. Mechem (1870–1946), American lawyer and politician

See also
Mecham
Meacham